The West Lancashire Coastal Plain is a large area in the south west of Lancashire, England.

The plain stretches from the Rimrose Valley in Seaforth, near Liverpool on the Mersey, to the south, to Preston on the Ribble, to the north. To the east, the plain is bounded by the foothills of the Pennines, while the western edge of the plain is separated from the sea by sand dunes.  It is very flat, and much of it is only a few metres above sea level.

The terrain is mostly glacial in origin. The area has been inhabited since Neolithic times, though large areas would have been marshy and contained Martin Mere.

The WWT Martin Mere near the villages of Holmeswood and Tarlscough gives a glimpse of what this area may have looked like prior to reclamation. The mere as it was before drainage of the area was the second largest body of fresh water in England, behind Windermere. The rivers Mersey, Alt and Ribble feed into the plain and the flood plains add to the flatness.

Large areas have been reclaimed and have a distinctive pattern of rectangular fields of dark peaty soil with deep drainage ditches. It is common to find the suffix "Moss" in the names of local places. As is usual in these types of areas, the settlements tend to be on any available hill, many formed by sandstone outcrops. The land is fertile and agriculturally very productive.  Vegetable crops include potatoes, carrots, cabbages, brussels sprouts and onions.

The main market town for this area was Ormskirk.  The Leeds and Liverpool Canal crosses the plain and, in summer, is used for irrigation, bringing water from the Pennines. The Trans Pennine Trail starts in Southport and crosses the plain following the Southport & Cheshire Lines Extension Railway to Aintree, before continuing towards Manchester and Hull. The historic Lathom House was built upon the plain.

References

External links
Environment Agency, accessed 21 February 2007
Exploring West Lancashire, accessed 21 February 2007

Landforms of Lancashire
Plains of England
Geography of the Borough of West Lancashire
Metropolitan Borough of Sefton
Geography of South Ribble
Geography of Chorley